The Netherlands Antillean guilder is the currency of Curaçao and Sint Maarten, which until 2010 formed the Netherlands Antilles along with Bonaire, Saba, and Sint Eustatius. It is subdivided into 100 cents (Dutch plural form: centen). On 1 January 2011, in the islands of Bonaire, Saba and Sint Eustatius, the guilder was replaced by the United States dollar. In Curaçao and Sint Maarten, the Netherlands Antillean guilder was proposed to be replaced by a new currency, the Caribbean guilder, but this was stalled indefinitely by negotiations over the establishment of a separate central bank for Curaçao. In November 2020, the Central Bank announced the introduction of the replacement guilder, which was planned to be implemented in the first half of 2021; however, implementation was delayed several times.

Naming 
In Papiamentu, the local language of Aruba, Bonaire and Curaçao, the guilder is called a "florin". The ISO-4217 code, ANG, is derived from ANtilliaanse Gulden, while the currency symbol, NAFl, is derived  from Netherlands Antilles Florin.

History
In the 18th century, the Dutch guilder circulated in the Netherlands Antilles. This was supplemented in 1794 by an issue of coins specific for the Dutch holdings in the West Indies. At this time, the guilder was subdivided into 20 stuiver.

Between 1799 and 1828, the reaal circulated on the islands, with 1 reaal = 6 stuiver or  reaal = 1 guilder. The Dutch guilder was reintroduced in 1828, now subdivided into 100 cents. When currency began once more to be issued specifically for use in the Netherlands Antilles, it was issued in the name of Curaçao, with the first banknotes and coins, denominated in the Dutch currency, introduced in 1892 and 1900, respectively. The name "Netherlands Antilles" (Nederlandse Antillen) was introduced in 1952.

In 1940, following the German occupation of the Netherlands, the link to the Dutch currency was broken, with a peg to the U.S. dollar of 1.88585 guilders = 1 dollar established. The peg was adjusted to 1.79 guilders = 1 dollar in 1971.

In 1986, Aruba gained a status aparte and thereby left the Netherlands Antilles. Shortly after that, Aruba began to issue its own currency, the Aruban florin, which replaced the Netherlands Antillean guilder at par.

In 2011, a year after the dissolution of the Netherlands Antilles, Bonaire, Saba and Sint Eustatius switched to the United States dollar, and the Netherlands Antillean guilder ceased to be legal tender in those territories.

Curaçao and Sint Maarten intended to replace the currency, thus they ceased production of the currency, but , these territories still use the Antillean guilder. Since 2018 banknotes and coins now require replacement and there are only two years of the Antilles guilder physical currency remaining. There has been a possibility that the islands could opt for the euro instead or possibly the US dollar.

In November 2019, Curaçao Finance Minister Kenneth Gijsbertha confirmed the introduction of the Caribbean guilder, and the Central Bank announced a year later.

By August 2021, it was reported that the new guilder was expected to be launched in either 2023 or 2024. In September 2022, however, CBCS aimed to introduce the guilder in 2024.

Coins

In 1794, silver coins were issued for use in the Dutch West Indies in denominations of 2 stuiver, 1 and 3 guilders. After the reintroduction of the Dutch guilder in 1828, some 1-guilder coins were cut into quarters and stamped with a "C" in 1838 to produce -guilder coins.

In 1900 and 1901, silver  and -guilder coins were introduced which circulated alongside Dutch coins. Following the German occupation of the Netherlands and the separation of the Netherlands Antillean currency from the Dutch, a bronze 1-cent coin was introduced in 1942, followed by a cupro-nickel 5-cent coin in 1943. Bronze  cent and silver 1 and  guilders were introduced in 1944.  The coinage of 1941–44 was minted in the United States and carries "P" or "D" mintmarks, and for most denominations a small palm tree. This money was also intended for use in Suriname.  The alternate Dutch names for some of these coins are: 5 cent—stuiver; 10 cent—dubbeltje; 25 cent—kwartje; and  guilders—rijksdaalder.

From 1952, the name "Nederlandse Antillen" appeared on the coins. In 1970, nickel replaced silver, although the -guilder coin was not reintroduced until 1978. Aluminium 1 and  cents were introduced in 1979. In 1989, aluminium 1 and 5 cents, nickel-bonded-steel 10 and 25 cents, and aureate-steel 50 cents, 1 and  guilders were introduced. Aureate-steel 5-guilder coins followed in 1998.

Banknotes
In 1892, the Curaçaosche Bank introduced notes in denominations of 25 and 50 cents, 1 and  guilders. This was the only issue of the cent denominations. Notes for 5, 10, 25, 50, 100, 250 and 500 guilders followed in 1900. The 1 and  guilder notes were suspended after 1920 but reintroduced by the government in 1942 as muntbiljet.

From 1954, the name "Nederlandse Antillen" appeared on the reverse of the notes of the Curaçaosche Bank and, from 1955, the muntbiljet ( guilders only) was issued in the name of the Nederlandse Antillen. In 1962, the bank's name was changed to the Bank van de Nederlandse Antillen. Starting in 1969, notes dated 28 AUGUSTUS 1967 began to be introduced. The front of these notes all feature the Statuut monument at front left instead of the allegorical seated woman found on the preceding issues, and on the back there is a new coat of arms. In 1970, a final issue of muntbiljet was made in denominations of both 1 and  guilders. The 500 guilder note was not issued after 1962. The 5 and the 250 guilder notes were not issued after 1998. The 5 guilder was replaced with a coin.

See also
Economy of the Netherlands Antilles
Central banks and currencies of the Caribbean

Notes

References

External links

 Banknotes of the Netherlands Antilles
 All banknotes

Currencies of the Caribbean
Fixed exchange rate
Economy of the Netherlands Antilles
Currencies of the Kingdom of the Netherlands
Currencies introduced in 1892